For the 1956–57 season, Carlisle United F.C. competed in Football League Third Division North.

https://www.11v11.com/teams/carlisle-united/tab/matches/season/1957/

Results & fixtures

Football League Third Division North

FA Cup

References
 11v11

Carlisle United F.C. seasons